Alex Cullen may refer to:
 Alex Cullen (politician)
 Alex Cullen (journalist)
 Alex Cullen (The Bill)

See also
 Alexander Cullen (disambiguation)